Gaurotes aeneovirens is a species of beetle in the family Cerambycidae. It was described by Holzschuh in 1993.

References

Lepturinae
Beetles described in 1993